CIRI-FM is a traffic advisory radio station that operates at 107.9 FM in Calgary, Alberta, Canada.

Owned by the City of Calgary, the station began broadcasting at 97.5 MHz as part of a year-long pilot project in 2006. It moved to its former 106.5 MHz frequency in early 2008 to make way for the new CIGY-FM, which launched on March 6, 2008 on the adjacent 97.7 FM frequency. In 2013, a new radio station (CKYR-FM) was launched on the adjacent frequency at 106.7 FM while CIRI-FM remained at 106.5, until the station received an upgrade on October 15, 2020 to replace the broadcasting equipment and relocate the transmitter to a more central location, thereby increasing the radio's coverage area over Calgary at its new current frequency 107.9 FM.

References

External links
Traffic Advisory Radio - City of Calgary 
 

Iri
Radio stations established in 2006
2006 establishments in Alberta